In mathematics, a queen's graph is a graph that represents all legal moves of the queen—a chess piece—on a chessboard. In the graph, each vertex represents a square on a chessboard, and each edge is a legal move the queen can make, that is, a horizontal, vertical or diagonal move by any number of squares. If the chessboard has dimensions , then the induced graph is called the  queen's graph.

Independent sets of the graphs correspond to placements of multiple queens where no two queens are attacking each other. They are studied in the eight queens puzzle, where eight non-attacking queens are placed on a standard  chessboard. Dominating sets represent arrangements of queens where every square is attacked or occupied by a queen; five queens, but no fewer, can dominate the  chessboard.

Colourings of the graphs represent ways to colour each square so that a queen cannot move between any two squares of the same colour; at least n colours are needed for an  chessboard, but 9 colours are needed for the  board.

Properties

There is a Hamiltonian cycle for each queen's graph, and the graphs are biconnected (they remain connected if any single vertex is removed).

Independence

An independent set of the graph corresponds to a placement of several queens on a chessboard such that no two queens are attacking each other. In an  chessboard, the largest independent set contains at most n vertices, as no two queens can be in the same row or column. This upper bound can be achieved for all n except n=2 and n=3. In the case of n=8, this is the traditional eight queens puzzle.

Domination
A dominating set of the queen's graph corresponds to a placement of queens such that every square on the chessboard is either attacked or occupied by a queen. On an  chessboard, five queens can dominate, and this is the minimum number possible (four queens leave at least two squares unattacked). There are 4,860 such placements of five queens, including ones where the queens control also all occupied squares, i.e. they attack respectively protect each other. In this subgroup, there are also positions where the queens occupy squares on the main diagonal only (e.g. from a1 to h8), or all on a subdiagonal (e.g. from a2 to g8).

Modifying the graph by replacing the non-looping rectangular  chessboard with a torus or cylinder reduces the minimum dominating set size to four.

The  queen's graph is dominated by the single vertex at the centre of the board. The centre vertex of the  queen's graph is adjacent to all but 8 vertices: those vertices that are adjacent to the centre vertex of the  knight's graph.

Domination numbers
Define the domination number d(n) of an  queen's graph to be the size of the smallest dominating set, and the diagonal domination number dd(n) to be the size of the smallest dominating set that is a subset of the long diagonal. Note that  for all n.

The domination number is linear in n, with bounds given by:
 

Let Kn be the maximum size of a subset of  such that every number has the same parity and no three numbers form an arithmetic progression (the set is "midpoint-free").

Define the independent domination number ID(n) to be the size of the smallest independent, dominant set in an  queen's graph. It is known that .

Colouring

A colouring of the queen's graph is an assignment of colours to each vertex such that no two adjacent vertices are given the same colour. For instance, if a8 is coloured red then no other square on the a-file, eighth rank or long diagonal can be coloured red, as a queen can move from a8 to any of these squares. The chromatic number of the graph is the smallest number of colours that can be used to colour it.

In the case of an  queen's graph, at least n colours are required, as each square in a rank or file needs a different colour (i.e. the rows and columns are cliques). The chromatic number is exactly n if  (i.e. n is one more or one less than a multiple of 6).

The chromatic number of an  queen's graph is 9.

Irredundance
A set of vertices is irredundant if removing any vertex from the set changes the neighbourhood of the set i.e. for each vertex, there is an adjacent vertex that is not adjacent to any other vertex in the set. This corresponds to a set of queens which each uniquely control at least one square. The maximum size IR(n) of an irredundant set on the  queen's graph is difficult to characterise; known values include

Pursuit–evasion game
Consider the pursuit–evasion game on an  queen's graph played according to the following rules: a white queen starts in one corner and a black queen in the opposite corner. Players alternate moves, which consist of moving the queen to an adjacent vertex that can be reached without passing over (horizontally, vertically or diagonally) or landing on a vertex that is adjacent to the opposite queen. This game can be won by white with a pairing strategy.

See also
 King's graph
 Knight's graph
 Rook's graph
 Bishop's graph

References

Mathematical chess problems
Parametric families of graphs